Mehmet Ali Bey (born 1874 in Istanbul) was an officer of the Ottoman Army and of the Turkish Army.

Medals and decorations
Order of the Medjidie 5th class
Gallipoli Star (Ottoman Empire)
Silver Medal of Liyakat 
Prussia Iron Cross 2nd class
Medal of Independence with Red Ribbon

See also
List of high-ranking commanders of the Turkish War of Independence

Sources

1874 births
20th-century deaths
Year of death missing
Military personnel from Istanbul
Ottoman Military Academy alumni
Ottoman Army officers
Ottoman military personnel of the Balkan Wars
Ottoman military personnel of World War I
Turkish Army officers
Turkish military personnel of the Turkish War of Independence
Turkish military personnel of the Greco-Turkish War (1919–1922)
Recipients of the Order of the Medjidie, 5th class
Recipients of the Silver Liakat Medal
Recipients of the Medal of Independence with Red Ribbon (Turkey)
Recipients of the Iron Cross (1914), 2nd class